Nichifor Crainic (pseudonym of Ion Dobre ; 22 December 1889, Bulbucata, Giurgiu County – 20 August 1972, Mogoșoaia) was a Romanian writer, editor, philosopher, poet and theologian famed for his traditionalist activities. Crainic was also a professor of theology at the Bucharest Theological Seminary and the Chișinău Faculty of Theology. He was an important racist ideologue, and a far-right politician. He was one of the main Romanian fascist and antisemite ideologues.

Crainic was a contributor of poetry to the modernist magazine Gândirea. After become disenfranchised with the publication's progressive views, rather than disassociate with the magazine he became increasingly intertwined in leadership positions in order to de-modernize it. At the end of a series of intellectual sparings within the publication itself, Crainic managed to wrest control of the magazine and institute a sea-change in editorial character supporting mystical Orthodoxy.

He developed an ideology given the name Gândirism (from gând – "thought"), a nationalist and neo-Orthodox Christian social and cultural trend. He edited the Gândirea magazine, and collaborated with numerous other publications such as Ramuri, România Nouă, Cuvântul, and Sfarmă-Piatră. He was also the editor in chief of the newspaper Calendarul.

Nichifor Crainic became a leading pro-Fascist figure in the political turmoil of the late 1930s, openly praising Mussolini and Hitler. He was an ideologue of antisemitism, although his prejudice was a defense of the Gospels rather than a vision of racial hierarchies. His beliefs were a major influence on the Iron Guard legionary movement, although Crainic viewed himself as a supporter of the legionnaires' rival King Carol II. In a 1938 essay, he theoretised the "ethnocratic state" as applied to Romania:

A fulfillment of ethnocracy was to be achieved through the means of a monarch-led corporatist system:

In 1940 he was elected a member of the Romanian Academy. He studied theology at the Seminary in Bucharest, and received his Ph.D. diploma from the University of Vienna.

He was appointed Minister of Propaganda for the Ion Antonescu regime.

After the Soviet army defeated the Germans and occupied Romania, Crainic went into hiding. A trial was conducted in his absence and he was found guilty of crimes against the people. He was eventually caught and imprisoned by the Romanian authorities in 1947, and spent 15 years in Văcăreşti and Aiud prisons. He was expelled from the Academy by the Communist regime.

Between 1962 and 1968 he was the editor of the Communist propaganda magazine Glasul Patriei ("The Voice of the Fatherland")—a magazine published in Romania by the Romanian Communist regime but sold only abroad, which they used as a tool to try to influence the Romanian intellectual émigrés to be patriotic and not work against the Communist Romania.

Notes

References
Roland Clark (2012): Nationalism and orthodoxy: Nichifor Crainic and the political culture of the extreme right in 1930s Romania, Nationalities Papers: The Journal of Nationalism and Ethnicity, 40:1, 107-126
Peter F. Sugar, Eastern European Nationalism in the Twentieth Century, University Press of America, 1995 (includes transcript of Crainic's essay)
The Report of the International Committee for the Study of Holocaust in Romania (on the Romanian Presidency site) - a review of the several Anti-Semitic doctrines, including Crainic's, that contributed to genocide of the Holocaust.

1889 births
1972 deaths
People from Giurgiu County
Members of the Romanian Cabinet
Members of the Romanian Orthodox Church
National-Christian Defense League politicians
National Christian Party politicians
Gândirea
Titular members of the Romanian Academy
Romanian essayists
Romanian fascists
Romanian magazine editors
Romanian magazine founders
Romanian newspaper editors
Romanian newspaper founders
20th-century Romanian poets
Romanian male poets
20th-century essayists
Eastern Orthodoxy and far-right politics
20th-century Romanian male writers
University of Vienna alumni
People detained by the Securitate
Inmates of Aiud prison
20th-century Romanian philosophers
Antisemitism in Romania
Christian fascists
Securitate informants